Vittoria Colonna (April 149225 February 1547), marchioness of Pescara, was an Italian noblewoman and poet. As an educated, married noblewoman whose husband was in captivity, Colonna was able to develop relationships within the intellectual circles of Ischia and Naples. Her early poetry began to attract attention in the late 1510s and she ultimately became one of the most popular poets of 16th-century Italy.  Upon the early death of her husband, she took refuge at a convent in Rome. She remained a laywoman but experienced a strong spiritual renewal and remained devoutly religious for the rest of her life. Colonna is also known to have been a muse to Michelangelo Buonarroti, himself a poet.

Early life and marriage
Colonna was born at Marino in 1492, a fief of the Colonna family in the Alban Hills, near Rome. She was the daughter of Fabrizio Colonna, grand constable of the Kingdom of Naples, and of Agnese da Montefeltro, daughter of the Duke of Urbino. She was engaged in 1495 at the age of 3 years old to "Ferrante" Fernando Francesco d'Ávalos, son of the marquese di Pescara, at the insistence of Ferdinand, King of Naples.

In 1501, the Colonna family's possessions and land were confiscated by Pope Alexander VI, and the family moved to Ischia, the home of Colonna's betrothed. In Ischia, Colonna received a typical humanist education in literature and the arts from Costanza d'Avalos, the aunt of her betrothed and gave early proof of a love of letters. Her hand was sought by many suitors, including the dukes of Savoy and Braganza, but she chose to marry d'Ávalos on the island of Ischia, on 27 December 1509. In Ischia, Vittoria Colonna became part of the literary circle of Costanza d'Avalos, Duchess of Francavilla, her husband's aunt.

The couple lived together in Ischia until 1511, when her husband offered his sword to the League against the French. He was taken captive in 1512 at the Battle of Ravenna and was conveyed to France. During the months of detention and the long years of campaigning that followed, Colonna and d'Avalos corresponded in the most passionate terms both in prose and verse, but only one poetic 'Epistle' to her husband has survived. Joseph Gibaldi has noted that Vittoria's poem to Ferrante was a direct imitation of Ovid's Heroides in which famous ancient women such as Dido and Medea address complaints to their absent lovers.  Because it is the only extant poem by Vittoria Colonna before her husband's death, one may question whether her passionate verse reflected her true passion for her husband or were merely a stylish and scholarly reaction to a particular event. Also, it is known that Ferrante was not the most faithful husband since he had an affair with one of Isabella d'Este's ladies-in-waiting.

Between 1516 and 1522, Colonna lost three members of her family. Her younger brother, Federico, died in 1516, followed by her father, Fabrizio, in 1520 and her mother, Agnese, in 1522.

Colonna and d'Avalos seldom saw each other during their marriage since he was one of the most active and brilliant captains of Emperor Charles V. However, Colonna's influence was sufficient to keep her husband from joining the projected league against the emperor after the Battle of Pavia (1525) and to make him refuse the crown of Naples that had been offered to him as the price of his treason towards the French.

Colonna spent the summer of 1525 at her father's castle in Marino, where she fell ill, and she suffered illness for the rest of her life. It was during that time that she received an early manuscript copy of Baldessare Castiglione's The Book of the Courtier, which she had circulated around Naples. On 21 September, Castiglione wrote her a letter to lament that she had thus enabled the unpublished work to be partially transcribed, and the pirated version pushed Castiglione into hastening the publication of his book.

Widowhood (1525–1547)
On 3 December 1525, Fernando died at Milan from the wounds that he had sustained at the Battle of Pavia. Colonna, who was hastening to tend him, received the news of his death at Viterbo She halted and retreated to the church of San Silvestro in Capite, in Rome, where there was a convent in the Order of Santa Chiara. Her request to take her vows and enter the convent was refused by Pope Clement VII and by her brother Ascanio, and she then returned to Ischia, where she remained for several years. Abigail Brundin has suggested Clement and Ascanio's motivations for refusing Colonna's request that they hoped for a future marriage to create another desirable political alliance. However, she refused several suitors and dedicated herself to writing poetry.

The Sack of Rome (1527) finally gave the Colonna family the opportunity to improve their relationship with the Medici pope, Clement VII, by offering help to the Roman population. However, when the French army attacked Naples, the whole house of Avalos took refuge on the island of Ischia.

Nine months after the sack of the papal city, the historian Paolo Giovio arrived on Ischia after he had been invited by Colonna, where he stayed until 1528. During his stay on the island, he wrote his unpublished Dialogus de viris ac foeminis aetate nostra florentibus, which is set on Ischia between the end of September and the beginning of December 1527. In the third book of the dialogue, Giovio includes a ten-page encomium of Colonna.

In 1529, Colonna returned to Rome and spent the next few years between that city, Orvieto, Ischia and other places. Moreover, she tried to correct the wrongs of her late husband by asking the house of Avalos to return to the abbey of Montecassino some wrongfully-seized land.

In 1532, before he died, Vittoria Colonna's cousin Cardinal Pompeo Colonna dedicated to her Apologia mulierum (Women's Apologia), a treatise that women should share in public offices and magistracies.

In 1535, her sister-in-law, Giovanna d'Aragona, separated from Colonna's brother Ascanio and came to Ischia. Colonna tried to reconcile them, but even though Giovanna refused, both women became close, supported Juan de Valdés and tried to intercede for Ascanio when he refused to pay salt tax to Pope Paul III.

In 1537, Colonna was in Ferrara, where she made many friends and helped to establish a Capuchin monastery at the instance of the reforming monk Bernardino Ochino, who later became a Protestant.

At the age of 46, in 1536, she was back in Rome, where she won the esteem of Cardinals Reginald Pole and Contarini and became the object of a passionate friendship on the part of 61-year-old Michelangelo. The great artist addressed some of his finest sonnets to her, made drawings for her and spent long hours in her company. She created a gift manuscript of spiritual poetry for him. Her removal to Orvieto and Viterbo in 1541, on the occasion of her brother's revolt against Paul III, produced no change in their relations, and they continued to visit and correspond as before.

On 8 May 1537, she arrived in Ferrara with some other women with the intention of continuing to travel to Venice and then to the Holy Land. It has been suggested that her aim in Ferrara was to establish a Capuchin monastery for Bernardino Ochino. Her health made Vittoria stay in Ferrara until February of the next year. Her friends dissuaded her from travelling to the Holy Land, and she returned to Rome in 1538.

She returned to Rome in 1544, staying as usual at the convent of San Silvestro and died there on 25 February 1547.

Pietro Bembo, Luigi Alamanni, Baldassare Castiglione and Marguerite de Navarre were among her literary friends. She was also on intimate terms with many of the members of the Italian reform movement, such as Pietro Carnesecchi and Ochino, but she died before the church crisis in Italy became acute. Although she was an advocate of religious reform, there is no reason to believe that her religious convictions were irreconcilable with those of the Catholic Church and that she ever became a Protestant.

Legacy 
Though it was long believed that Colonna's poetry fell out of fashion after the 16th century, her poetry has been republished every century since, often in multiple editions. Her Rime amorose have been shown to have inspired the Spanish-Neapolitan poet Francisco de Aldana.

List of works

Poetry

Published posthumously

Notes

References

 
 
 Cox, Virginia (2014), Lyric Poetry by Women of the Italian Renaissance, ed., Johns Hopkins University Press

Further reading

Och, Marjorie (1993). Art Patronage and Religious Reform in Sixteenth-Century Rome. Diss. Bryn Mawr College.
Och, Marjorie (2002). “Portrait Medals of Vittoria Colonna: Representing the Learned Woman,” in Women as Sites of Culture: Women’s Roles in Cultural Formation from the Renaissance to the 20th Century, ed. Susan Shifrin, pp. 153-66. Aldershot, Hampshire, England: Ashgate. Collected in Literature Criticism from 1400 to 1800, pp. 30-36, ed. Lawrence J. Trudeau. Farmington Hills, MI: Gale, 2013.
Och, Marjorie (2001).  “Vittoria Colonna and the Commission for a Mary Magdalen by Titian,” in Beyond Isabella: Secular Women Patrons in Renaissance Italy, eds. S. Reiss and D. Wilkins, pp. 193-223. Kirksville, MO: Truman State University Press; reprinted 2002.
Och, Marjorie (2011).  “Vittoria Colonna in Giorgio Vasari’s Life of Properzia de’ Rossi,” in Wives, Widows, Mistresses, and Nuns in Early Modern Italy, ed. Katherine McIver.  Aldershot, Hampshire, England: Ashgate.
Roscoe, Maria. Vittoria Colonna: her Life and Poems. 1868

External links

Bibliography for Vittoria Colonna, compiled by Ellen Moody.
 (with a chapter on Vittoria Colonna)
 

1490 births
1547 deaths
People from Marino, Lazio
Vittoria Colonna
Italian Roman Catholics
Italian women poets
16th-century Italian nobility
16th-century Italian women writers
16th-century Italian writers
Italian Renaissance writers
Michelangelo
D'Avalos family
Spirituali
Muses
Sonneteers